The 48th Cuban National Series was won by La Habana over Villa Clara. Ciego de Ávila, who had the best regular season record, lost in the semifinals. Defending champion Santiago de Cuba were ousted in the first round.

Regular season standings

West

East

Playoffs

References

Cuban National Series seasons
Cuban National Series
Cuban National Series
2008 in Cuban sport